(WecA, WecA transferase, GPT, TagO) is an enzyme with systematic name . This enzyme catalyses the following chemical reaction

   UMP + 

References

External links 
 

EC 2.7.8